On 18 April 2014, a group of sixteen Chinese citizens, later identified as ethnic Uyghurs, engaged in a shootout with Vietnamese border guards after seizing their guns as they were being detained to be returned to China. Five Uyghurs and two Vietnamese border guards died in the incident. Ten of the Uyghur perpetrators were men and the rest were women or children.

Shootout
The confrontation began after the guards detained the migrants around noon inside a border post with the intention of returning them to the Chinese authorities. <ref name=nyt1> Some of the detainees grabbed one or more AK-47 assault rifles from the guards and opened fire on them. <ref name=nyt1>

Hundreds of police officers and border guards surrounded the building during the standoff and urged the migrants inside to surrender. Some of the migrants who died committed suicide, while the others were shot dead by Vietnamese police officers and border guards.

References 

History of Vietnam (1945–present)
Crime in Vietnam
Battles involving Vietnam
Conflicts in 2014
2014 in international relations
2014 in Vietnam
2014 in China
China–Vietnam border
Xinjiang conflict
Attacks in Asia in 2014
2014 crimes in Vietnam
Attacks in China in 2014
Attacks in Vietnam
2014 crimes in China